Carlson Hall at the University of Utah in Salt Lake City, Utah, United States was built during 1937–38. It was listed on the National Register of Historic Places in 1996, and was a part of the campus until it was demolished in 2012.

Description
The buildings is significant as one of only two historic women's dormitories in Utah, and as a Works Progress Administration (WPA) project. It was built after a "three-decade long struggle to have a women's dormitory constructed" at the University of Utah, initiated by Lucy M. Van Cott, Dean of Women at the university for 25 years.  The cause was supported by the Utah Federation of Women's Clubs, who lobbied the state legislature for a bill to provide funding, but that bill failed to pass in 1913.

It was eventually funded by an estate gift of $121,000 from Mary P. Carlson, plus $90,000 of WPA funding.

For many years, Carlson Hall housed the University of Utah's History Department, and in its final years it was used for office and classroom space by the S.J. Quinney College of Law. In Summer 2012, Carlson Hall was demolished to make way for a new expanded home for the College of Law.

See also

 National Register of Historic Places listings in Salt Lake City

References

External links

University and college buildings on the National Register of Historic Places in Utah
Renaissance Revival architecture in Utah
School buildings completed in 1938
Buildings and structures in Salt Lake City
Residential buildings on the National Register of Historic Places in Utah
Works Progress Administration in Utah
National Register of Historic Places in Salt Lake City